Phyllomacromia africana is a species of dragonfly in the family Corduliidae. It is found in the Republic of the Congo, the Democratic Republic of the Congo, Egypt, Ghana, Guinea-Bissau, Nigeria, Senegal, Sudan, Tanzania, Uganda, possibly Ethiopia, and possibly Malawi. Its natural habitats are subtropical or tropical moist lowland forests and rivers.

References

Corduliidae
Taxonomy articles created by Polbot